Isidoro Bosarte (1747–1807) was a Spanish historian and writer of Spanish arts.

References 

Spanish male writers
Spanish art historians
Spanish art critics
1747 births
1807 deaths